Castor is a village in Bienville Parish in north Louisiana, United States. The population was 209 at the 2000 census but increased 23% to 258 in 2010. The median age was 32.2 years. The village was established in 1900. The name "Castor" refers to the genus Castoridae or beaver, a Latin term, contrary to an oral tradition of the word being Native American in origin.

Castor's ZIP code is 71016, and the local landline AT&T telephone numbers start with 544, with wireless number prefixes varying according to service provider. A number of surrounding smaller villages, both incorporated and not, including Roy, utilize the ZIP code of Castor.

History
During the Civil War, Castor supplied salt for the Confederacy. A salt works was operated west of Castor by Alfred P. King. The area supplied hundreds of young men as soldiers during the Civil War, including the Castor Guards and the Bienville Rifles.

Dr. Dempsey Sullivan was a physician who saw patients from horseback. His daughter, Willie Sullivan, married Sam Smith, and the couple had 21 children. All but one of the children who died are interred at the New Ebenezer Cemetery. Mrs. Bonnie Daniel and Mrs. Merlene Young lived the furthest away in Weatherford and Kerrville, Texas,  respectively, but they too are buried at Ebenezer.

The Sam and Willie Sullivan Smith family, one of the oldest in Castor, lost six members in a tornado in 1950. Mr. and Mrs. Smith, Elaine Smith, Celia Sullivan (Mrs. Smith's sister), Dottie Jo Knotts, and Prentice Little were all killed.  The homestead was wiped clean except for a bucket on the water well which remained undisturbed. The Smith family sold most of its land to Jerry "Cotton" Guin, an employee of Libbey Glass in Shreveport, who raised bees there until 2009.

The Louisiana rails to trails project, which extends from Sibley to Winnfield, deconstructed the once Kansas City Southern Railway track to make a recreational nature trail that, on completion, runs through the center of Castor.

The first school in Castor was located in the former Masonic lodge near the site of the present United Methodist Church. By 1912, Castor State Bank joined a small group of businesses on North Front Street. The bank and other buildings burned in 1929. A new bank building, a two-story brick structure, opened with the upper floor reserved for the Masonic lodge. This bank closed in 1933, but the top floor was still maintained by the lodge and the Order of the Eastern Star, which had been chartered in Castor on June 6, 1912. In the winter of 1983, fire destroyed this building, and the lodge records were lost. A new lodge hall was constructed in 1985 across from the Methodist Church.

In the late evening of April 23, 2000, Castor was struck by a tornado with a half-mile-wide path of destruction, which caused massive damage. There were no severe injuries, but the infrastructure damage caused the closure of most small businesses as well as the public school for a period of weeks. Most of the affected buildings were demolished or renovated because of the severe damage.

Discovered in 2007-2008, the Haynesville Shale, one of the largest natural gas deposits in the United States, sits underneath northwest Louisiana, including Castor. A large pocket of the Haynesville Shale was developed at the edge of the village, but an industrial/production accident involving the site damaged the pocket, making it unusable for the time being.

Geography
Castor is located at  (32.252757, -93.164933).

Landscape
At ground level, Castor seems flat and surrounded by trees; however, in reality it sits in a valley which makes it a dead area for cell phone coverage. Verizon recently constructed a tower within a few miles of the village, allowing satisfactory reception of the Verizon Wireless network.

The active area or center of Castor is the four-way intersection of LA 4/LA 153 and LA 507, but the city limits extend from the light for about a quarter mile in all directions.

Demographics

As of the census of 2000, there were 209 people, 88 households, and 52 families residing in the village. The racial makeup of the village was 85.17% White, 11.96% African American, 2.87% from other races. Hispanic or Latino of any race were 3.83% of the population.

There were 88 households, out of which 30.7% had children under the age of 18 living with them, 46.6% were married couples living together, 10.2% had a female householder with no husband present, and 39.8% were non-families. 38.6% of all households were made up of individuals, and 23.9% had someone living alone who was 65 years of age or older. The average household size was 2.38 and the average family size was 3.25.

In the village, the population was spread out, with 30.1% under the age of 18, 5.3% from 18 to 24, 30.1% from 25 to 44, 14.8% from 45 to 64, and 19.6% who were 65 years of age or older. The median age was 36 years. For every 100 females, there were 97.2 males. For every 100 females age 18 and over, there were 87.2 males.

The median income for a household in the village was $23,125, and the median income for a family was $35,000. Males had a median income of $23,750 versus $35,833 for females. The per capita income for the village was $11,963. About 17.3% of families and 20.3% of the population were below the poverty line, including 20.8% of those under the age of eighteen and 15.7% of those 65 or over.

Gallery

Religion
Castor has two churches within the immediate village: the United Methodist on Louisiana Highway 507 and the First Baptist Church, a Southern Baptist affiliate, on Front Street adjacent to the Castor School Complex. South on Louisiana Route 153 is the New Ebenezer Baptist Church, also a Southern Baptist congregation.

Castor has three cemeteries: the Old Castor Cemetery east of the downtown area toward the village of Lucky, the Page Family Cemetery located directly behind the New Ebenezer Baptist Church, and the New Ebenezer Cemetery affiliated with the New Ebenezer Baptist Church.

The religious trends of the area coincide with the southern United States tradition which expresses highly conservative values.

Castor government

Myrtis Lucille Gregory Methvin, a native of Attala County, Mississippi, was the first woman mayor of Castor, having served from 1933 to 1945. She was the second woman mayor in Louisiana.Lula Wardlow of Montgomery in Grant Parish preceded Methvin as a woman mayor from 1926 to 1930. Methvin's son, DeWitt T. Methvin, Jr., a long-term attorney and legal and civic leader in Alexandria, is interred at New Ebenezer Cemetery in Castor, where he was reared during the 1930s and graduated in 1940 from Castor High School.

Current Castor Mayor Vicki Pickett assumed office early in 2009 following the illness and subsequent death of former Mayor Sally Gray.

Education
Castor has one school located on Front Street. The complex contains a Pre-K and Kindergarten, elementary, middle, and high school buildings. The current principal is Mrs. Joy-Dee Wallace.

Castor has spawned notable academic achievements. In 2015, three competitors (Sydney Anderson, Kaitlyn Calhoun, and Brittony Cole) in the Future Business Leaders of America National Conference became the first competitors in the parish and Castor High School history to place top 15 in the nation. In 2016, one BETA club member (Mateo Chavez) placed first and third at the state conference and advanced to the national competition. There he placed top ten in both events; seventh in Spelling Division I and first in the nation in Creative Writing. One year later, another Castor High BETA member (Gabrielle Guin) placed second at the state conference in the Handmade Jewelry competition. She qualified and will compete at the national competition. In 2018, at the Future Business Leaders of America State Conference, Mateo Chavez and Brittney Lea made school history. Mateo became the first ever winner of the Richard D Clanton Memorial Scholarship Award from Castor. Brittney Lea won the 2018 Who’s Who in Louisiana FBLA Award. She will be recognized st the National Leadership Conference in Baltimore this summer.

Public transportation
The Council on Aging works in the area to give elderly and disabled means of transportation.

Roads
Running through Castor are three main highways: Hwy 153 (known in Castor as Front Street), Hwy 507 and Hwy 4 which intersect in the middle of Castor at a 4-way-stop caution light. Other roads include The Ridge Rd, Elm St, Pardee St, Oak St, Watson Rd and Lodge St.

Water systems
Castor and the area around has two sources of water: the Castor Water System and the Alberta Water System.  The Alberta Water System was founded by local businessman Reginald A. Page.

Media
The primary source of news in Castor is the Shreveport Times. There are also the Ringgold Progress and the Bienville Democrat, which is published in Arcadia.

Cable television does not reach into Castor area. Viewers rely on antennas or satellites for coverage.

Economy

Castor has several businesses: the General Store, a gasoline station, flower shop, a cafe, a beauty shop, a laundromat, a branch of the Bank of Montgomery (formerly Bank of Ringgold), United States Post Office, retirement homes, and a mobile home park. The majority of working adults commute to one of the more urban areas nearby for employment.

Notable people

 Lee Smith, pitcher, Major League Baseball, seven-time All-Star selection, inducted into the Hall of Fame in 2019
 Jamie Fair, member of the Louisiana House of Representatives from 1980–1984
 John Len Lacy, represented Bienville Parish in the Louisiana House from 1964–1968
 E. R. Minchew, principal of Castor High School (1932–1964)
 Enoch T. Nix, banker from Bossier City and 30-year member of the Louisiana State Board of Education and its replacement body, the Board of Elementary and Secondary Education, born in Jamestown but graduated from Castor High School

References

Movie " Arkansas" 2020

Villages in Bienville Parish, Louisiana
Villages in Louisiana